2016 Faroe Islands Premier League was the 74th season of top-tier football on the Faroe Islands. For sponsorship reasons, it was known as Effodeildin. B36 Tórshavn were the defending champions, having won their eleventh Faroese title in 2015.

The season was scheduled to begin on 5 March 2016 and conclude on 22 October 2016.

Teams

Suðuroy and EB/Streymur had finished 9th and 10th respectively at the end of the previous season and were relegated to the 1. deild as a result.

Replacing them were the 1. deild champions Skála and runners-up B68 Toftir.

Team summaries

League table

Positions by round

Results

Regular home games

Additional home games

Top goalscorers

References

 
Faroe Islands Premier League seasons
1
Faroe
Faroe